The Năstase Cabinet was a cabinet of ministers led by Adrian Năstase that governed Romania from 28 December 2000 to 29 December 2004 during the third term of President Ion Iliescu. It was a minority cabinet formed by the winner of the 2000 parliamentary elections, PDSR, which included also members of other parties, non-parliamentary parties (PSDR, PUR). It was supported by a legislative coalition which included PNL (only for three months) and UDMR.

Members

Prime Minister: 
Adrian Năstase

Ministers of State:
Alexandru Athanasiu
Ioan Rus
Marian Săniuță
Dan Ioan Popescu
Ioan Talpeș

Ministers:
Rodica Stănoiu/Cristian Diaconescu (Justice)
Ioan Mircea Pașcu (Defense)
Mihai Tănăsescu (Finance)
Răzvan Theodorescu (Culture)
Miron Mitrea (Public Works and Transport)
Ilie Sârbu/Petre Daea (Agriculture)
Daniela Bartoș/Mircea Beuran/Ionel Blănculescu/Ovidiu Brânzan (Health)
Mircea Geoană (Foreign Affairs)
Dan Ioan Popescu (Economy and Commerce)
Marian Sârbu/Elena Dumitru/Dan Mircea Popescu (Labor)
Dan Nica/Silvia Adriana Țicău (Communications)
Aurel-Constantin Ilie/Petru Lificiu/Ilie Sârbu/Speranța Ianculescu (Environment)
Șerban Mihăilescu/Eugen Bejinariu (Coordinating the General Secretariat of the Government)
Ioan Rus/Marian Săniuță (Interior)
Ecaterina Andronescu/Alexandru Athanasiu (Education)
Hildegard Puwak/Vasile Pușcaș/Alexandru Fărcaș (European Integration)
Vasile Dâncu (Public Information)
Octav Cozmâncă (Public Administration)
Acsinte Gaspar (Relation with Parliament)
Silvia Ciornei (Small and Medium Enterprises)
Georgiu Gingăraș (Youth and Sport)
Dan-Matei Agathon (Tourism)

Minister-Delegates:
Gabriel Oprea/Gheorghe Emacu (Public Administration)
Eugen Dijmărescu/Vasile Radu (Commerce)
Acsinte Gaspar/Șerban Nicolae (Relation with Parliament)
Vasile Pușcaș (Chief Negotiator with the EU)
Ovidiu Muşetescu (Authority for Privatization)
Ionel Blănculescu (Coordinating Control Bodies)
Marian Sârbu/Bogdan Niculescu-Duvăz (Relation with Social Partners)
Șerban Valeca (Research Activity)

Cabinets of Romania
2000 establishments in Romania
2004 disestablishments in Romania
Cabinets established in 2000
Cabinets disestablished in 2004